The 1975 Cork Intermediate Hurling Championship was the 66th staging of the Cork Intermediate Hurling Championship since its establishment by the Cork County Board in 1909. The draw for the opening round fixtures took place at the Cork Convention on 26 January 1975.

On 10 August 1975, Ballinhassig won the championship following a 3–12 to 2–05 defeat of Blackrock in the final at the Mardyke. This was their first ever championship title.

Blackrock's Danny Buckley was the championship's top scorer with 6-05.

Team changes

To Championship

Promoted from the Cork Junior Hurling Championship
 Watergrasshill

From Championship

Promoted to the Cork Senior Hurling Championship
 Bandon

Regraded to the City Junior Hurling Championship
 Brian Dillons

Results

First round

Quarter-finals

Semi-finals

Final

Championship statistics

Top scorers

Overall

In a single game

References

Cork Intermediate Hurling Championship
Cork Intermediate Hurling Championship